Tangariki Reete is an I-Kiribati politician serving as the Speaker of the House of Assembly. She served as a Member of the House of Assembly from 2008 until 2020, during which she also served as the first Minister for Women, Youth and Social Affairs from 2013 until 2016. She was elected as the Speaker on 22 May 2020, beating the previous Speaker, becoming the first female Speaker in Kiribati's history.

House of Assembly

Member of Parliament
She spent 3 terms as an MP, leaving office after being defeated in the second round of voting by Tebao Awerika in 2020.

Speaker
Reete won a parliamentary vote to become Speaker of the House of Assembly on 22 May 2020. She won with 25 votes and defeated incumbent Speaker Tebuai Uaai, who was supported by the Tobwaan Kiribati Party. Betio MP Ioteba Redfern was sworn in as Deputy Speaker on 23 November 2021.

References

Living people
21st-century I-Kiribati women politicians
21st-century I-Kiribati politicians
Members of the House of Assembly (Kiribati)
Year of birth unknown
Speakers of the House of Assembly of Kiribati
Pillars of Truth politicians
Women government ministers of Kiribati
People from the Gilbert Islands
Year of birth missing (living people)